Terlizzi is a town and comune of the region of Apulia in southern Italy, in the Metropolitan City of Bari, lying to the west of the seaport of Bari on the Adriatic Sea, in the midst of a fertile plain. , its population was some 27,000.

History
Terlizzi is first mentioned in an 8th-century AD document, when its Lombard possessor donated the area to the Abbey of Montecassino. After the Byzantine domination, from the 11th century Trelizzi was under the influence of the counts of Giovinazzo, whose member Amico fortified both the cities. Later it was ruled by the Tuzziaco, Wrunfort, Orsini di Taranto and Grimaldi families.  The oldest map of Terlizzi still hangs in the Palace at Monte Carlo of the latter's house.

It became a commune after the Unification of Italy in 1861, when it had 18,000 inhabitants.

Main sights
It had a castle which at one time was very strong, and occasionally resorted to by the Emperor Frederick II, and later by the Aragonese sovereigns of Naples. The back-lit clock on that tower is the second largest in Europe after Big Ben.

The Co-Cathedral of San Michele Arcangelo was built in Neo-Classicist style in the 18th and 19th centuries, replacing the old Romanesque Duomo of the 13th century. It houses several canvasses and a notable collection of wooden statues.

The walls and towers of the town remain, but the fosse was turned into boulevards.

In 1745, a fine Greek-made inkstand inlaid in silver was found in a nearby, ancient cove, in Suberito (at now, Sovereto).

One of the last remaining stretches of the Appian Way that is still unpaved runs through the outskirts of Terlizzi. This stretch of the Appian Way is part of the Via Appia Traiana, built by Emperor Trajan sometime around 115 AD.  Just off this road,  out of the town, is the church of Santa Maria di Cesano, built in 1055 AD. It houses a precious Byzantine fresco of Christ Pantocrator.
In the centre of the city is notable the big Palace built by the Barons de Gemmis, with the annexed church of Santa Maria La Nova. It is from the 18th century and was designed by the architect Luigi Vanvitelli.

People
Ferrante de Gemmis, writer 
Gennaro de Gemmis, writer from the same family
Nichi Vendola, Governor of Apulia from 2005
Michele de Napoli, painter
Giuseppe Millico (1739–1802), castrato contemporary of Farinelli
Dionigi "Tony" Catalano (1921–2011)
Felipe Posada Di Terlizzi (1999–present)
Ilaria De Pinto (1983–present) Angel

References

Cities and towns in Apulia
Castles in Italy